Gillett Ice Shelf is a narrow ice shelf occupying an indentation of the coast off the Wilson Hills between the peninsula containing the Holladay Nunataks and the Anderson Peninsula.  Mapped by United States Geological Survey (USGS) from surveys and U.S. Navy air photos, 1960–63. Named by Advisory Committee on Antarctic Names (US-ACAN) for Captain Clarence R. Gillett, USCG, who served on the USCGC operations, December 1966 to May 1970.

References

Ice shelves of Antarctica
Bodies of ice of Oates Land